This is a list of girl groups of all musical genres. Girl groups are musical groups that only contain female vocalists. This is distinct from all-female bands, wherein the members themselves perform the instrumental components of the music (see List of all-female bands). This is not a list of solo female musicians or singers.

0–9 and symbols 
 11:30 (Canada)
 15& (South Korea)
 22/7 (Japan)
 2NE1 (South Korea)
 2R (Hong Kong)
 2YOON (South Korea)
 3 of Hearts (United States)
 3LW (United States)
 3rd Faze (United States)
 The 411 (United Kingdom)
 4 in Love (Taiwan)
 4 Cats (Lebanon)
 4Minute (South Korea)
 4th Impact (Philippines)
 702 (United States)
 7Senses (China)
9.9 (United States)
 9nine (Japan)
 °C-ute (Japan)

A
 Aa! (Japan)	
 Abcho (Japan)
The Ad Libs (United States)
Aespa (South Korea)
Afro-dite (Sweden) 
After School (South Korea)
 Ai-Girls (Japan)	
AKB48 (Japan)
AKB48 Team SH (China)
AKB48 Team TP (Taiwan)
Akishibu Project (Japan)
Al Balabil (Sudan)
Alisha's Attic (United Kingdom) 
All Saints (United Kingdom)
Allure (United States)
Aly & AJ (United States) 
Amiaya (Japan)
Andrews Sisters (United States)
The Angels (United States)
 Angerme (formerly S/mileage) (Japan)
 Anna S (Japan)
 AOA (South Korea)
 AOA Black
 AOA Cream
Apink (South Korea)
Appleton (Canada)
Apollonia 6 (United States)
 Aqua5 (Japan)
 As One (Hong Kong)
 As One (South Korea)
 Atarashii Gakko! (Japan)
 Athena & Robikerottsu (Japan)
Atomic Kitten (United Kingdom)

B

 BaBe (Japan)	
 Tomoko Kondo, Yukari Nikaido
 Babymetal (Japan)	
 Babyraids Japan (Japan)
Baby Vox (South Korea) 
Baccara (Spain)
Bakusute Sotokanda Icchome (Japan)
Bananarama (United Kingdom)
Bandana (Argentina) 
Barbara and the Uniques (United States)
Bardot (Australia)
Before Dark (United States)
BeForU (Japan)
BEJ48 (China)
 Belle Amie (United Kingdom)
Bellefire (Ireland)
 Bellepop (Spain)
Berryz Kobo (Japan)
 BESTie (South Korea)
 Beauty4  (Taiwan)
The Beu Sisters (United States)
 Bisou (Germany)
Blackpink (South Korea) 
Blaque (United States)
Blink Indonesia (Indonesia)
 Blush (United States, Philippines, India, Hong Kong, Japan, South Korea)
BNK48 (Thailand)
The Bobbettes (United States)
Boswell Sisters (United States)
Boy Krazy (United States)
Boys World (United States)
The Braillettes (United States)
The Braxtons (United States)
 Bright (Japan)
 Brown Eyed Girls (South Korea)
Brownstone (United States)
 bump.y (Japan)
 Buono! (Japan)
Bubbles (Sweden)
 Buzy (Japan)
B*Witched (Ireland)
BY2 (Singapore, Taiwan)

C
The Cake (United States)
 Candies (Japan)
The Caravelles (United Kingdom)
The Carefrees (United Kingdom)
 Chakra (South Korea)
Changing Faces (United States)
The Chantels (United States)
 Checkicco (Japan)
The Cheeky Girls (Romania) 
 Cheeky Parade (Japan)
The Cheetah Girls (United States)
Cherish (United States)
Cherry (Australia)
 Cherrybelle (Indonesia)
The Chiffons (United States)
China Dolls (Thailand)
 Chocolat (South Korea)
 Chocolate, Menta, Mastik (Israel)
 Chocolove from AKB48 (Japan)
The Chordettes (United States)
 Ciao Bella Cinquetti (formerly The Possible) (Japan)
 Cimorelli (United States)
 ClariS (Japan)
 CLC (South Korea)
Clea (United Kingdom)
Clear’s (Japan)
Cleopatra (United Kingdom)
Clique Girlz (United States)
 Cobra Killer (Germany)
 CoCo (Japan)
Coconuts Musume (Japan)
Collar (Hong Kong)
Company B (United States)
Cookies (Hong Kong)
The Cookies (United States)
Country Musume (now Country Girls) (Japan)
Cosmic Girls (also WJSN)  (South Korea, China)
The Cover Girls (United States)
Crayon Pop (South Korea)
The Crystals (United States)
Cute (Japan)
CY8ER (Japan)

D
 D&D (Japan)
 Dal Shabet (South Korea)
 Dancing Dolls (Japan)
Danity Kane (United States)
Daphne and Celeste (United States)
 Davichi (South Korea)
Def.Diva (Japan)
Dempagumi.inc (Japan)
Destiny's Child (United States)
DIA (group) (South Korea)
 Diadems (France)
Diva (Japan)
The Dixie Cups (United States)
The Dixiebelles (United States)
 Doce (Portugal)
 DoCo (Japan)
 Doll Elements (Japan)
 Dolly Dots (Netherlands)
 Dorothy Little Happy (Japan)
 Dream (Japan)
Dream (United States)
 Dreamcatcher (South Korea)
 Dream Girls (Taiwan, South Korea)
 Dream Morning Musume (Japan)

E
E-girls (Japan)
Ecomoni (Japan)
Eden's Crush (United States)
The Emotions (United States)
En Vogue (United States)
 Escarcha (Colombia)
Especia (Japan)
Eternal (United Kingdom)
The Exciters (United States)
 Everglow (South Korea)
 Excellence (Sweden)
EXID (South Korea)
Exposé (United States)
 EyeQ (Denmark)

F
 f(x) (South Korea, China)
 Fairies (Japan)
 FAKY (Japan)
 FANATICS (South Korea)
 Fem2fem (United States)
Feminnem (Croatia, Bosnia-Herzegovina)
 Fifth Harmony (United States) 
 Fin.K.L. (South Korea)
Flans (Mexico)
Flap Girls' School (Japan)
The Flirtations (United States)
FLO (UK)
Flower (Japan)
Four Golden Princess (Malaysia)
The Four King Cousins (United States)
Four of Diamonds (UK)
Frank (UK)
 French Kiss (Japan)
Funky Diamonds (Germany)

G
GAM (Japan)
 GFriend (South Korea)
 (G)I-dle (South Korea)
 Gimmel (Finland)
Girlband (Australia)
Girlfriend/gf4 (Australia)
Girls Aloud (United Kingdom, Ireland)
 Girls Can't Catch (United Kingdom)
 Girl's Day (South Korea)
 Girlicious (United States)
 Girls (Brazil)
 Girl Authority (United States)
 Girls' Generation (South Korea, United States)
 Girl Thing (United Kingdom)
 GNZ48 (China)
 Gomattō (Japan)
 The Grace (South Korea)
 G.R.L. (Canada, United Kingdom, United States)
 The GTOs (United States)
 Guardians 4 (Japan)
 GWSN (South Korea)

H
 Ha*Ash (United States, Mexico)
 Happiness (Japan)
 Thee Headcoatees (United Kingdom)
 Holly Golightly, Kyra LaRubia, Ludella Black, "Bongo" Debbie Green.
Heartsdales (Japan)
Hello Venus (South Korea)
Hepsi (Turkey)
 Hey Girl (Taiwan)
 Hi-5 (Greece, Cyprus)
 High-King (Japan)
 HKT48 (Japan)
 Hōkago Princess (Japan)
The Honeys (United States)
Honeyz (United Kingdom)
 HotCha (Hong Kong)
 HR (Japan)
Huckapoo (United States)

I
i5 (Philippines, Israel, United States, United Kingdom, Mexico)
 I.B.I (South Korea)
 I.O.I (South Korea)
 I Me (China)
 i.n.g (Taiwan)
 Ice Creamusume (Taiwan)
 Idol College (Japan)
 Idol Renaissance (Japan)
Innosense (United States)
IQ (United States)
Isyss (United States)
Iz*One (South Korea, Japan)
 i☆Ris (Japan)
 Ive (South Korea)

J
J.J. Fad
Jackson Mendoza
Jade (United States)
 Jamali (South Africa)
Jaynetts (United States, 1960s)
 Jeans (Mexico)
 Jewelry (South Korea)
 JKT48 (Indonesia)
 JS (United States)
 Juice=Juice (Japan)
 June's Diary (United States)

K
 K3  (Belgium)
 Kamen Joshi (Japan)
 Kamen Rider Girls (Japan)
 Kara (South Korea)
Keyakizaka46 (Japan)
King Sisters (United States)
 Kira Pika (Japan)	
 Kiroro (Japan) 
 Kiruba (Ecuador)
 Krusty (Hong Kong)
Ksis (Brazil)

L
 L5 (France)
 Laboum (South Korea)
 Ladies' Code (South Korea)
Las Cheris (Puerto Rico)
Las Ketchup (Spain)
 LaViVe (Germany)
 L.E.J (France)
 Leandah (Germany)
Lemonescent (United Kingdom)
The Lennon Sisters (United States)
Lillix (Canada)
LinQ (Japan)
Little Mix (United Kingdom)
 Little Trees (Denmark)
Loïs Lane (The Netherlands)
Lollipop (Italy)
Lolly Talk (Hong Kong)
Loona (South Korea)
Love & Sas (Canada)
 Love Bites (England)
 Lovely Doll (Japan)
 Lovelyz (South Korea)
Luv' (Netherlands)
 Lyrical School (Japan)

M
 M Three (Japan)
M-Girls (Malaysia)
M2M (Norway)
Madasun (United Kingdom)
Mamamoo (South Korea)
Mania (United Kingdom)
Mango (Lithuania)
Marcie Jones and the Cookies (Australia)
Martha & the Vandellas (United States)
The Marvelettes (United States)
Mary Jane Girls (United States) 
Mary Mary (United States) 
 Maywood (Netherlands)
 Me N Ma Girls (Burma)
Mel & Kim (United Kingdom) 
Melon Kinenbi (Japan)
 The Mess (France)
 Milky Holmes (Japan)
 Millionaires (United States)
 Milky Way (Japan)
 Minimoni (Japan)	
 Mini Viva (United Kingdom)
 Mis-Teeq (United Kingdom)
 Miss A (South Korea)
 MNL48 (Philippines)
 Mocha Girls (Philippines)
 Moje 3 (Serbia)
MoKenStef (United States)
 Momoiro Clover Z (Japan)
Momoland (South Korea)
 Monrose (Germany)
Morning Musume (Japan)
The Murmaids (United States)
 MKS (United Kingdom)

N
 Nakano Fujo Sisters (Japan)
 Chiaki Kyan, Yuka Kyōmoto, Erika Ura, Yuka Konan, Kana Seguchi, Ai Hasegawa, Maki Fukumi 
 Nature (South Korea)
 Saebom, Aurora, Lu, Chaebin, Gaga, Haru, Uchae, Sunshine
 Neon Jungle (United Kingdom)	
 Shereen Cutkelvin, Amira McCarthy, Asami Zdrenka, Jessica Plummer
 Niki & Gabi (United States)
 Niki DeMar, Gabi DeMartino
Nina Sky (United States)
Natalie Albino, Nicole Albino
Nine Muses (South Korea)
Moon Hyun Ah, Son Sung Ah, Park Kyung Ri, Pyo Hye Mi, So Jin and Keum Jo (formerly Jaekyung, Bini, Rana, Lee Sem, Eunji, Sera, Minha, Euaerin)
 NiziU (Japan)
Mako Yamaguchi, Riku Ōe, Rima Nakabayashi, Rio Hanabashi, Maya Katsumura, Miihi Suzuno, Mayuka Ogō, Ayaka Arai, Nina Makino-Hillman
NMB48 (Japan)
 Mayu Ogasawara, Kanako Kadowaki, Rika Kishino, Haruna Kinoshita, Riho Kotani, Rina Kondō, Kanna Shinohara, Kei Jōnishi, Miru Shiroma, Aina Fukumoto, Shiori Matsuda, Yūki Yamaguchi, Nana Yamada, Sayaka Yamamoto, Akari Yoshida, Miyuki Watanabe, Riona Ōta, Rena Kawakami, Momoka Kinoshita, Yūka Kodakari, Rena Shimada, Eriko Jō, Yui Takano, Airi Tanigawa, Ayame Hikawa, Runa Fujita, Mao Mita, Ayaka Murakami, Sae Murase, Fūko Yagura, Natsumi Yamagishi, Keira Yogi, Anna Murashige
no3b (Japan)
Haruna Kojima, Minami Takahashi, Minami Minegishi
No Angels (Germany)
Nadja Benaissa, Lucy Diakovska, Sandy Mölling, Vanessa Petruo, Jessica Wahls
No Secrets (United States, United Kingdom)
Angel Faith, Jessica Fried, Carly Lewis, Jade Ryusaki & Erin Tanner
Nobody's Angel (United States)
Ali Navarro, Sarah Smith, Tai Amber Hoo, Jennie Kwan (formerly Stacey Harper, Amy Sue Hardy)
Nochiura Natsumi (Japan)
Maki Goto, Aya Matsuura, Natsumi Abe
Nogizaka46 (Japan)
Manatsu Akimoto, Mikumo Ando, Erika Ikuta, Rina Ikoma, Rena Ichiki, Nene Ito, Marika Ito, Sayuri Inoue, Yumiko Iwase, Misa Eto, Yukina Kashiwa, Hina Kawago, Mahiro Kawamura, Asuka Saito, Chiharu Saito, Yuri Saito, Reika Sakurai, Mai Shiraishi, Kazumi Takayama, Kana Nakada, Himeka Nakamoto, Seira Nagashima, Nanase Nishino, Ami Nojyo, Nanami Hashimoto, Seira Hatanaka, Hina Higuchi, Mai Fukagawa, Minami Hoshino, Sayuri Matsumura, Seira Miyazawa, Rina Yamato, Yumi Wakatsuki, Maaya Wada
The Nolans (Ireland, United Kingdom)
Bernie Nolan, Coleen Nolan, Linda Nolan, Maureen Nolan, Ann Nolan, Denise Nolan, Amy Wilson, Julia Duckworth
Nonstop (Portugal)
 Andrea Soares, Kátia Moreira, Liliana Almeida, Ana Rita Reis, Fátima Sousa
Northern State (United States)
Hesta Prynn, Correne Spero, Robyn Sprout
Not Yet (Japan)
Yuko Oshima, Rie Kitahara, Rino Sashihara, Yui Yokoyama
Nu Virgos (Ukraine)
Nadya Granovskaya, Vera Brezhneva, and Anya Sedokova
Nylon (Iceland)
Alma, Emilía, Steinunn Camilla, and Klara
N Zero (Japan)

O

 O'G3NE (Netherlands)
 Lisa Vol, Amy Vol, Shelley Vol 
 Oh!GG (South Korea)
 Taeyeon, Sunny, Hyoyeon, Yuri, Yoona
 Oh My Girl (South Korea)
 Hyojung, Mimi, YooA, Seunghee, Jiho, Binnie, Arin
 The OMG Girlz (United States)
 Miss Star, Miss Beauty, Miss Babydoll
 One Voice (Philippines)
 Monica Castillo, Anne "Marie" Ceralvo, Edna "Mae" Ceralvo, Melissa Ruiz Moreno, Aimee Castillo, Lindsay Mangoba
Orange Caramel (South Korea)
 Raina, Nana, Lizzy
 Osaka Performance Doll (Japan)
 Atsuko Inaba, Ayano Furutani, Yukiko Takeuchi, Miho Ueda, Kumiko Nakano
 Otome Shinto (Japan)
 Yurika Takahashi, Ayame Tajiri, Mari Aihara, Mayu Ogata, Arisa Sonohara, Airi Hasegawa
  (Hong Kong)
 Ai, Maho, Rika, Rinka
 Out of Eden (United States)
 Lisa Kimmey, Andrea Kimmey-Baca, Danielle Kimmey

P
 Pandora (Mexico)
 Fernanda Meade, Isabel Lascurain, Mayte Lascurain
The Paris Sisters (USA)
Party Rockets GT (Japan)
Pepsi and Shirlie (United Kingdom)
Priscilla, Sherell & Albeth
 Perfume (Japan) 	
 Ayano Ōmoto (Nocchi), Yuka Kashino (Kashiyuka), Ayaka Nishiwaki (A~Chan)
 Petitmoni (Japan)
 Hitomi Yoshizawa, Makoto Ogawa, Ayaka Kimura (formerly Sayaka Ichii, Kei Yasuda, Maki Goto)
 Pink Lady (Japan)
 Mie, Kei
 The Pipettes (United Kingdom)
 Rosay, Gwenno, Riot Becki
Play (Sweden)
Faye Hamlin, Anaïs Lameche, Janet Leon, Rosie Munter, Anna Sundstrand, Sanne Karlsson, Emelie Norenberg
Point of Grace 
Shelley Breen, Heather Payne, Denise Jones, Terry Jones
The Pointer Sisters (United States)
Anita, Bonnie, Ruth and June Pointer 
The Poppies
 Popu Lady (Taiwan)
 Hongshi, Dayuan, Bao'er, Tingxuan, Yushan
Precious (United Kingdom)
Louise Rose, Anya Lahiri, Sophie McDonnell, Kalli Clark-Sternberg, Jenny Frost
 Predia (Japan)
 Akane Minato, Akina Okamura, Keiko Sawaguchi, Mai Mizuno, Reiko Aoyama, Rumina Murakami, Runa Matsumoto, Sakurako, Yuu Maeda, Yuzuka Hayashi
 Preluders (Germany) (Albania)
 Tertia Botha, Miriam Cani, Anh-Thu Doan, Rebecca Miro, Anne Ross, Patricia "Trish" Sadowski
 Prizmmy (Japan)
 Mia Kusakabe, Reina Kubo, Karin Takahashi, Hina Miyazaki
 Pucchi Moni (Japan): see Petitmoni
Pump Girls (United States)
Colleen Elizabeth Cottrell, Sara Cronstedt, Heather Faland, Debbie Lemus, Janelle Munion, Brittany Rausch
The Pussycat Dolls (United States)
PYT (United States)

Q
 Quarteto em Cy (Brazil)
 Queen & Elizabeth (Japan)
Queens (Poland)
Queensberry (Germany)

R
 Rainbow (South Korea)
 Red Velvet (South Korea)
 Reflex (Russia)
 Rev. from DVL (Japan)
Reynolds Girls (United Kingdom) 
 RichGirl (United States)
 The Roches (United States)
 Rocket Girls (China)
 Romans (Japan)	
The Ronettes (United States)
Rouge (Brazil)
 The Rounder Girls (Austria)

S

 Sakura Gakuin (Japan)
Salt-N-Pepa (United States) 
 The Saturdays (United Kingdom, Ireland)
 SDN48 (Japan)
 Secret (South Korea)
Seduction (United States)
 SeeYa (South Korea)
 The SeeYa (South Korea)
 The Sequence (United States)
 Serebro (Russia)	
 SES  (South Korea)
 SGO48
Shakaya (Australia)
Shakespears Sister (United Kingdom)
The Shangri-Las (United States)
S.H.E (Taiwan)
SHeDAISY (United States)
The Shirelles (United States)
 Shiritsu Ebisu Chugaku (Japan)
 Shugo Chara Egg! (Japan)	
Silver Convention (Germany)
 S.I.N.G (China)
 Sistanova (Germany)
 Sistar (South Korea)
The Sisters Love (United States)
Sister Sledge (United States)
 SKE48 (Japan)
Slinkee Minx (Australia)
Slumber Party Girls (United States)
Smile.dk (Sweden) 
SNH48 (China)
SOAP (Denmark)
Sonamoo (South Korea)
SOS (Indonesia)
 Solid Harmonie (United Kingdom, United States)
Soluna (United States)
SPICA (South Korea)
Spice Girls (United Kingdom)
Starling Arrow (United States)
Stellar (South Korea)
 Stooshe (United Kingdom)
Strawberry Switchblade (United Kingdom)
STRAYZ (Hong Kong)
Sugababes (United Kingdom)
Sugar Jones (Canada)
 Sunmyu (Japan)
 Super Girls (Japan)
 Super Girls (Hong Kong)
Supernova (Chile)
The Supremes (United States)
Sweet California (Spain)
Sweet Female Attitude (United Kingdom)
Sweet Honey in the Rock (United States)
 Sweets (Japan)
Sweety (Taiwan)
SWV (United States)

T

 t.A.T.u. (Russia)
Tanpopo (Japan)
 T-ara (South Korea)	
 Taiyō to Ciscomoon (Japan)
 Team Syachihoko (Japan) 	
Teen Queens (Australia)
Tess (Spain)
Tha Rayne (United States)
The Three Degrees (United States)
Thriii (United States)
Tiny-G (South Korea)
TLC (United States)
 Tokyo Girls' Style (Japan)
 Tokyo Performance Doll (Japan)
Total (United States)
The Toys (United States)
 TrueBliss (New Zealand)
TrySail (Japan)
 Tsuri Bit (Japan)
TSZX (Korea)
Tú (Canada)
Twins (Hong Kong, Canada)
Twice (South Korea, Japan, Taiwan)

U
 Ultra Girl (Japan)
 Up Up Girls (Kakko Kari) (Japan)
 Uni.T (South Korea)

V

 v-u-den (Japan)
Vanilla (United Kingdom) 
Vanity 6 (United States)
 Ventino (Colombia)
The Veronicas (Australia) 
 VIA Gra (Russia)
Viva (India)
Viva Hot Babes (Philippines) 
The Voices (United States)

W
W (Japan)
Walkie Talkie (Taiwan)
 Wa$$up (South Korea)
Watarirouka Hashiritai 7 (Japan)
Weather Girls (Taiwan, Japan)
The Weather Girls (United States)
Wendy & Lisa (United States)
West End Girls (Canada)
 WHY@DOLL (Japan)
Wilson Phillips (United States) 
Wild Orchid (United States)
WJMK (South Korea)
 Wonder Girls (South Korea)
Wonderland (Ireland, United Kingdom)

X
 X21 (Japan)
XG (Japan)
Xscape (United States) 
XXL (Republic of Macedonia)

Y
Young Divas (Australia)
Yumemiru Adolescence (Japan)

Z
Zhané (United States)
ZOEgirl (United States)
ZYX (Japan)

See also
List of all-female bands
Lists of musicians

Lists of musicians
Lists of women in music
Lists of bands